The Waterpark Creek is a creek located in Central Queensland, Australia.

The headwaters of the creek rise below Samuel Hill in the Great Dividing Range and flows in a south easterly direction. The creek descends  over its  course.

In the section within the Byfield National Park, the creek contains a population of Rhadinocentrus ornatus, a small freshwater fish species.

See also

References

Rivers of Queensland
Central Queensland
Bodies of water of the Coral Sea